was a Japanese politician and member of the House of Representatives of Japan representing Kanagawa Prefecture.

Biography 

Yoshiyuki Kamei was born on 30 April 1936. He graduated from Keio University in 1962.

He was Minister of Agriculture, Forestry and Fisheries in the cabinet of Junichiro Koizumi, before being replaced by Yoshinobu Shimamura. He had also previously served as Transport Minister under Ryutaro Hashimoto.

Kamei died on 12 May 2006. He was 70.

References 

General sources
http://home.kyodo.co.jp/modules/fstStory/index.php?storyid=246423%27

|-

|-

|-

1936 births
2006 deaths
People from Isehara, Kanagawa
Politicians from Kanagawa Prefecture
Keio University alumni
Members of the House of Representatives (Japan)
Ministers of Agriculture, Forestry and Fisheries of Japan
Liberal Democratic Party (Japan) politicians
21st-century Japanese politicians